Present-day Irish has numerous loanwords from English. It is a result of bilingualism within a society where there is a dominant, superstrate language (in this case, English) and a minority substrate language with few or no monolingual speakers and a perceived "lesser" status (in this case, Irish).

Types
Anglicisms exists in many forms, from the direct translation of English phrases to the common form of creating verbal nouns from English words by adding the suffix -áil (this is also used to form verbs from native roots, such as trasnáil, "cross over", from trasna "across", tuigeáil (Connacht, Ulster) "understanding" (Munster tuiscint), from tuig "understand", and so on). Táim ag runáil go dtí an siopa ("I'm running towards the shop") is an anglicism, as "runáil" is a verb created from the English word "run" with the Irish suffix -áil attached; the traditional Irish for this would be Táim ag rith go dtí an siopa.

Calquing also occurs: an English phrase is literally translated into Irish, even though an equivalent Irish phrase already exists. An example of this is "Moilligh síos" ("slow down" – moill "delay" + síos "downwards", calqued from English), instead of the more traditional Maolaigh ar do luas ("reduce your velocity"), or simply Maolaigh! ("Slow down!").

Old borrowings
Many words that are commonly thought by "purists" to be anglicisms have been a part of the Irish language for a long time, and have become "nativised". At the same time, certain words that are sometimes assumed to be from English are actually from Norse or Norman French, and as such are not true anglicisms. For example:

 liosta: "list"
 aidhm: "aim" (Norman French ; where cuspóir is considered by some to be the 'native' Irish word)
 halla: "hall" (Norse ; the Irish word is áras).
 véarsa, béarsa [the b- form considered to be uneducated dialect]: "verse" (Norman French  ; the Irish word is rann)
 cathaoir: "chair" (both words derive from Latin )
 sciorta: "skirt" (both words are from Norse skyrta)
 cóta: "coat" (both words are from Anglo-Norman cotte)
forc: "fork" (both from Latin furca)
pláta: "plate" (both from Old French plate, from Medieval Latin plata)
grúpa: "group" (both from French groupe)
seans: "chance" (both from Old French chance)
coinneal: "candle" (both ultimately from Latin candēla)
páipéar: "paper" (Old Irish páipér; both words derive from Old French paper, papier)
leathar: "leather" (Old Irish lethar, Old English leþer; both words derive from the Proto-Indo-European root *létrom)
loch: "lake", "lough" (Old Irish loch, Old English lagu; both words derive from the Proto-Indo-European root *lókus, "pond, pool")
Other words are 'early anglicisms', having entered the language in the 18th and 19th centuries:

 praghas: "price" (also possibly from Norman French)
 dabht: "doubt" (the Irish words are: amhras, gó)

The word péint may have been borrowed directly from English "paint" or from Old French peint. The verb pinntél ("to paint") appears in some Old Irish works.

Other words are actually Celtic roots that have entered English:
carr: "car" (Old Irish carr, "wagon", from Proto-Celtic karros)
cros: "cross" (the Irish word is from Latin crux; the English form with -s at the end may be a borrowing directly from Old Irish)
clog: "clock" (Old Irish cloc, Latin clocca, possibly of Celtic derivation)
peata: "pet (animal)" (entered English from Scottish Gaelic, from Middle Irish pet[t]a; possibly from French petit, "small," or Brittonic *petti-, "thing, piece")
 iarann: "iron" (both words ultimately derive from Proto-Celtic *īsarnom, "iron")

False cognates
The word ród ("road, route"), most commonly seen in iarnród (iron road, i.e. railway) is actually derived from Old Irish rót (from ro-sét, "great path", or rōut, "distance, length") and is not a borrowing of English road, although it may have been influenced by the Old English root rād ("riding").

Oighean, the Irish word for "oven", is not derived from the English; it comes from Middle Irish aigen ("cooking-vessel, pan"), from Celtic root *aginâ ("vessel"). English oven is from Old English ofn, from Proto-Germanic *uhnaz.

Dé (a term used before names of days of the week, as in Dé hAoine, "Friday"), is a false cognate: it derives from Latin dies, which is from Proto-Italic *djēm, PIE *dyḗws ("heaven"), while English "day" is from Old English dæġ, from Proto-Germanic *dagaz.

Domhan ("world") is derived from a Celtic root *dubnos, meaning "deep"; it is not related to English domain, which is ultimately from Latin domus, "house".

Modern concepts
 

Words used for foreign inventions, imports, and so on, where a native Irish word does not exist, are often a macaronic import as well. These are strictly speaking not anglicisms, but examples of loans from foreign languages. In some cases an Irish word has been developed, and in others it has not. This has been a characteristic of word development in the language for as long as written records exist, and is not limited to anglicisms. In some cases the original Irish word is no longer known, or has a different meaning within the same semantic field:

Modern forms:
 fón, guthán "phone"
 carr, gluaisteán "car" 
 badhsuiceal, rothar "bicycle"

Older forms:
 iarla (Norse ), tiarna (Irish) "lord, earl"
 póg (Old Welsh , Latin  "(kiss of) peace") "kiss"
 bád (Old Norse), currach (Irish) "boat"
 garsún (Munster), gasúr (Connacht, Ulster), from French  "small boy", buachaill (Irish) "teenager, youth"

Variation
In some cases, the foreign loan has an official pronunciation in Irish, and a colloquial one based on English; the colloquial form is an anglicism, while the official form is a Gaelicisation of the foreign word:

 ceint ( or ) "cent"
 bus ( or ) "bus"

The most striking forms of anglicisms, however, are the names of the letters of the alphabet—the vast majority of which are normally said in the English way, except for —as well as the use of words such as bhuel ("well"), dheas ("yes"), no ("no"), jost ("just"), dhiúnó ("you know" – for tá's agat) and álraight ("all right" – for go maith). Such words are used with their English syntax in Irish:

 
 Well, I'll just wait here, you know, till you come back.
 
 Are you all right there, lad? - No, I'm not all right at all.

 : Job (beside  from French,  from Latin)
 , : Zoo (where  already exists)
 w > bh / v: ,  "strolling, walking"

Republican use

During The Troubles, between the 1970s and the 1990s, many physical force Irish republican prisoners in Long Kesh (later the Maze Prison) often spoke in Irish, for cultural reasons and to keep secrets from warders. This was dubbed the "Jailtacht", a portmanteau of "jail" and "Gaeltacht", the name for an Irish-speaking region.

It is thought by some that the Republican slogan  ("Our day will come") is a form of anglicism, more idiomatic equivalents being Beidh ár lá linn ("Our day will be with us") or Beidh ár lá againn ("We will have our day"). However, the verb teacht, meaning "come", is often used in a variety of phrases to express the "coming" of days, such as tháinig an lá go raibh orm an t-oileán d’fhágaint ("the day came when I had to leave the island)".

Similar phenomenon in Scottish Gaelic
Some examples include:

 stòraidh, "story" (instead of sgeulachd)
 gèam, "game" (instead of cluiche)
 tidsear, "teacher" (instead of the older mùin(t)ear)
 nurs, "nurse" (instead of banaltram)

References

 
Macaronic forms of English
Language contact